Musa Ghazi (1928–2003; Urdu: موسیٰ غازی) was a veteran Pakistani left winger footballer who captained the Pakistan national football team during the 1960s. Ghazi played for East Bengal and Mohammedan Sporting Club (Kolkata) in the 1950s. After the independence of Pakistan in 1947, he migrated with his family to Pakistan. He was offered Indian citizenship in the 1950s but opted to sit tight. He has scored 62 goals for East Bengal Club.

Under his leadership, the Pakistan national football team were able to achieve the top three Asian rankings in the late 1950s and 1960s, a far cry from its current 50th rankings among Asia's 60 teams. His brother Abid Ghazi is a retired player and football fan.

Ghazi died on 12 May 2003, at the age of 75.

Honours

East Bengal
Durand Cup: 1956–57
IFA Shield: 1958
DCM Trophy: 1957

Pakistan
Merdeka Tournament runner-up: 1962

Individual
 Most goals in DCM Trophy: 12 (with East Bengal).

References

1928 births
2003 deaths
Muhajir people
Pakistani footballers
Pakistan international footballers
Footballers from Karachi
East Bengal Club players
Association football midfielders
Calcutta Football League players
Pakistani expatriate footballers
Expatriate footballers in India